Red Salute (also released as Arms and the Girl) is a 1935 American comedy film directed by Sidney Lanfield and starring Barbara Stanwyck and Robert Young. Based on a story by Humphrey Pearson, the film is about the daughter of a US Army general who becomes involved with a suspected communist agitator.

Plot
Drue Van Allen, the daughter of an American general, is in love with communist graduate student Leonard Arner. When Leonard is ejected from a college campus for speaking to the students, a newspaper photographer takes a picture of him in Drue's car and prints it on the front page. When Drue ignores her father’s advice, he tricks her into boarding an airplane bound for Mexico, supposedly to see her aunt Betty off, then locks her in.

She is stuck in Juarez with no money to get home. After a rowdy soldier, Jeff overhears a border policeman warn her not to try to cross into the US, Jeff, whom she nicknames "Uncle Sam", strikes up a conversation, telling her he thinks she should be shot. Despite their disdain for each other, they run up a large bar bill, but neither has any money. They skip out and drive away; then Drue tells him he has stolen a government car. When they reach a border crossing, Jeff tries to stop, but Drue presses the gas pedal and they speed into Texas. They manage to evade their pursuers, but crash into a tree.

They later kidnap P. J. Rooney, an easy-going, henpecked husband, to ride in his homemade trailer. He is glad to get away from his wife, Edith. They eventually con Baldy, a caretaker, into believing they are friends of his employer, Colonel Turner, and letting them stay in Turner's house. After Jeff and Drue dance, he tells her he now loves her; after thinking it over, she kisses him before they turn in for the night, in separate rooms. She later sneaks out and tries to drive away, but the authorities show up and arrest them both.

General Van Allen gets Drue out of jail. He is worried about a newspaper story reporting that Drue and Leonard are going to get married and also about information he received from an immigration official that Leonard is not a citizen, but rather a suspected "paid propagandist" in the country on a student visa. When the general realizes that Drue has feelings for Jeff, he sends for Jeff. After speaking to him informally, the general sends him down to a meeting at which Leonard is supposed to speak. Jeff pretends to have changed his opinion to get Arner to let him talk to the audience. He starts out agreeing with Leonard's position, then shows people what he really stands for. A riot breaks out, and Arner is taken into custody for deportation.

Drue realizes she is in love with Jeff. They get married and honeymoon in P.J.'s trailer.

Cast
 Barbara Stanwyck as Drue Van Allen
 Robert Young as Jeff "Uncle Sam"
 Hardie Albright as Leonard Arner
 Cliff Edwards as P.J. Rooney
 Ruth Donnelly as Mrs. Edith Rooney
 Gordon Jones as Michael (Lefty) Jones
 Paul Stanton as Louis Martin
 Purnell Pratt as General Van Allen
 Nella Walker as Aunt Betty
 Arthur Vinton as Joe Beal
 Edward McWade as Baldy
 Henry Kolker as Dean
 Henry Otho as Border Policeman
 Allan Cavan as Army Officer
 Ferdinand Gottschalk as League Speaker
 Selmer Jackson as Army Officer
 David Newell as Student

Production
The original working title of the film was Her Uncle Sam. The film was made to cash in on the rise of radicalism in US colleges in the 1930s. Filming started in June 1935. The film features the song "I Wonder Who's Kissing Her Now", sung by Edwards.

It was one of the first anti-communist movies made in the US. This saw it re-released in 1948 with the rise in anti-communist feeling.

The film is also known by its reissue title Her Enlisted Man.

Critical response
Writing for The Spectator in 1935, Graham Greene praised the film, describing it as "one of the best comedies of the screen since It Happened One Night", and characterizing the acting of Stanwyck and Young as "admirable performances".

References

External links

 (incomplete)

1935 films
1930s romantic comedy-drama films
American romantic comedy-drama films
1930s English-language films
American black-and-white films
Films set in Mexico
Films set in Washington, D.C.
Films produced by Edward Small
1935 comedy films
1930s American films